Phillip J. Maloof is a businessman who served as a Democratic member of the New Mexico Senate. In 1998, he contested New Mexico's 1st congressional district losing to Republican candidate Heather Wilson in the special election and the general election.

References

1967 births
20th-century American politicians
American politicians of Lebanese descent
Democratic Party New Mexico state senators
Living people